Britta Lillebil Sofia Kjellén, a.k.a. Lillebil Nordrum (December 3, 1921 – March 7, 1994) was a Swedish actress born Drammen, Norway to Swedish parents. She grew up in Stockholm, Sweden, where she attended the Royal Dramatic Training Academy. She made her screen debut in the 1938 film Karriär, and she played several roles in Swedish films in the 1940s and 1950s. Kjellén was married to the Swedish chef Tore Wretman from 1945 to 1953, and then to the Norwegian actor Lars Nordrum.

Filmography

 Career (1938) as the young lady in front of the theater manager in the audience at the Apollo Theater
 Life Begins Today (1939) as a ballet dancer (uncredited)
 Beredskapspojkar (1940) as a guest at the dance (uncredited)
 Karusellen går (1940) as a funfair visitor (uncredited)
 Only a Woman (1941) as a dinner guest at the Juréns (uncredited)
 Fransson the Terrible (1941) as Britta Lund
 Nygifta (1941) as the young lady at the restaurant (uncredited)
 Uppåt igen (1941) as a young lady (uncredited)
 Doktor Glas (1942) as Lowenius's daughter
 Olycksfågeln nr 13 (1942) as Mary Borring
 Flickan är ett fynd (1943) as Karin
 Life and Death (1943) as Gittan
 Narkos (1944) as a woman at the party (uncredited)
 På farliga vägar (1944) as Kid Gaston's girlfriend
 13 stoler (1945) as Gun Svärdsjö, a cigarette girl at the Café Royal
 En förtjusande fröken (1945) as Julia, Paul's maid
 Tre söner gick till flyget (1945) as Åke's girlfriend
 Försök inte med mej ..! (1946) as Miss Kulle, Kronberg's secretary
 I Love You Karlsson (1947) as Connie Schmidt
 Kvinnan gör mig galen (1948) as Sissi
 Beef and the Banana (1951) as Kerstin Carve
 The Green Lift (1952) as Elsie
 The Magnificent Lie (1955) as Gertrud, a maid
 The Summer Wind Blows (1955) as Mrs. Lindgren, the woman on the train
 Peter van Heeren (1957) as Miss Lyng
 Millionær for en aften (1960)

References

External links
 
 Lillebil Kjellén at the Swedish Film Database
 Lillebil Kjellén at Sceneweb
 Lillebil Kjellén at Filmfront

1921 births
1994 deaths
Swedish film actresses
Swedish stage actresses
20th-century Swedish actresses
People from Drammen